Cott may refer to:
Cott, an Anglo-Saxon homestead in Britain, used as a placename ending. See List of generic forms in place names in Ireland and the United Kingdom; see Cottage. 
Cott Corporation, a beverage and foodservice company based in Canada.